Tagali Rural LLG a local-level government (LLG) of Koroba-Kopiago District in Hela Province, Papua New Guinea.

Wards
01. Halongali
02. Hava
03. Ula
04. Peta-Porogorali
05. Munima
06. Karita 1
07. Karita 2
08. Henganda 1
09. Henganda 2
10. Mbuli
11. Eganda
12. Kongiabi
13. Kayakali
14. Paijaka 1
15. Paijaka 2
16. Hariba
17. Tulupu Manopi
18. Pii Nakia
19. Mt. Kare 1
20. Mt. Kare 2

References 

Local-level governments of Hela Province